The Hunted is a 1948 American film noir crime film starring Preston Foster, Belita, Pierre Watkin and Edna Holland. It was directed by Jack Bernhard.

Plot

A policeman sends his girlfriend to prison and won't leave her alone when she gets out.

Cast
 Preston Foster as Johnny Saxon
 Belita as Laura Mead
 Pierre Watkin as Simon Rand, Attorney
 Edna Holland as Miss Turner
 Russell Hicks as Dan Meredith Chief of Detectives
 Frank Ferguson as Paul Harrison
 Joseph Crehan as Police Captain
 Larry J. Blake as Hollis Smith
 Cathy Carter as Sally Winters
 Charles McGraw as Detective
 Tris Coffin as Detective

Reception

Critical response
Film critic Leonard Maltin said of the film, "Low-budget noir has a hard-boiled sheen but a prosaic, overlong treatment; it even finds time for one of Belita's ice skating routines!"

References

External links
 
 
 
 

1948 films
1948 crime drama films
Allied Artists films
American crime drama films
American black-and-white films
Film noir
Films directed by Jack Bernhard
1940s English-language films
1940s American films